Jesper Just (born 1974) is a Danish artist, who lives and works in New York. From 1997 to 2003, he studied at the Royal Danish Academy of Fine Arts.

He has work in museums including the Guggenheim Museum in New York, Tate Modern in London and the Museum of Modern Art in New York.

Films 

His film trilogy A Voyage in Dwelling (2008) included performances by Benedikte Hansen, and music composed by Dorit Chrysler.

Exhibitions 

A Fine Romance, Midway Contemporary Art, St. Paul (2004)
Something to Love, Herning Kunstmuseum, Herning, Denmark (2005) and Moderna Museet, Stockholm, Sweden (2006)
Black Box, Hirshhorn Museum, Washington, DC (2006)
Something To Love, Stedelijk Museum, Amsterdam, The Netherlands (2006)
Jesper Just, Miami Art Museum, Miami, (2007) and touring Kunsthuis Witte de With in Rotterdam, Ursula Blickle Foundation in Kraichtal, Germany, and the Stedelijk Museum voor Actuele Kunst in Ghent, Belgium (2007)
It Will All End in Tears, La Casa Encendida, Madrid, (2008)
Romantic Delusions, Brooklyn Museum, Brooklyn (2008/2009)
Intercourses, Danish Pavilion, 55th International Art Exhibition of la Biennale di Venezia (2013)

Reception 

In 2006 a New York Times reviewer described It Will All End in Tears as "... a beautiful spectacle that dazzles as it happens and then fades away like a puff of smoke". In 2008 a different New York Times reviewer described him as a "... still young, abundantly talented and wonderfully original artist".

He received second prize in the Carnegie Art Award at Kópavogur Arts Museum in Reykjavik in 2008, and the Eckersberg Medal in 2014.

References

Further reading

 Amsellem, Patrick, ed. Jesper Just: Romantic Delusions, exhibition catalogue essay by Bill Horrigan. Brooklyn: Brooklyn Museum, 2008.
 Just, Jesper, ed. "It Will All End in Tears", exhibition catalogue, Texts by Agustin Perez Rubio, Svala Vangsdatter Andersen and Octavio Zaya. Madrid: La Casa Encendida, 2008.
 Von Olfers, Sophie, ed. Jesper Just Film Works, 2001-2007, exhibition catalogue, Rotterdam: Witte de With, 2007.
 Knudsen, Gry Høngsmark and Holger Reenberg eds. Something to Love, exhibition catalogue, Herning: Herning Kunstmuseum, 2005.
  "Fall Preview: Jesper Just's Schizo Enigma. Four Films at the Brooklyn Museum of Art, September 2, 2008", The Village Voice
 "Jesper Just", The New York Times, August 10, 2007
 "Jesper Just and Dorit Chrysler: This nameless spectacle (live)", video interview by Louisiana Channel.

Danish photographers
1974 births
Living people
Royal Danish Academy of Fine Arts alumni
Recipients of the Eckersberg Medal
Danish contemporary artists
20th-century Danish photographers
21st-century Danish photographers
Photographers from Copenhagen